The  Little League World Series took place between August 20 and August 24 in Williamsport, Pennsylvania. Granada Hills National Little League of Granada Hills, California, defeated Stratford Original Little League of Stratford, Connecticut, in the championship game of the 17th Little League World Series.

For the first time, the championship game was televised, as highlights were broadcast by ABC on Wide World of Sports. This was the third consecutive title for the state of California. , this is the longest winning streak by a U.S. state.

Teams

Winners bracket

Consolation bracket

References

External links
1963 Little League World Series
Line scores for the 1963 LLWS

Little League World Series
Little League World Series
Little League World Series